Ernest Grégoire Yélémou (born July 13, 1988) is a Burkinabé professional footballer who plays as a striker. He made a scoring debut for Bejaia in their 3–2 defeat at home to ES Sétif in the 2011–12 Algerian Ligue Professionnelle 1 on January 31.

Club career
On January 12, 2012, Yélémou signed for Algerian club JSM Bejaia. On January 31, 2012, he made his debut for the club as a starter in a league game against ES Setif, scoring a goal in the 40th minute of the game.

Statistics

References

1988 births
Living people
Burkinabé footballers
Association football forwards
JSM Béjaïa players
Algerian Ligue Professionnelle 1 players
Expatriate footballers in Algeria
Burkinabé expatriate sportspeople in Algeria
Rail Club du Kadiogo players
21st-century Burkinabé people